Andriivka is an urban-type settlement in the Snizhne Municipality, Donetsk Oblast (province) of eastern Ukraine. Since 2014, it has been under the control of the self-declared Donetsk People's Republic. Population:

Demographics
Native language as of the Ukrainian Census of 2001:
 Ukrainian 73.87%
 Russian 25.83%
 Belarusian 0.04%

References

Urban-type settlements in Horlivka Raion